Thanopoulos may refer to:

 Thanopoulos (supermarket), Greek supermarket chain
 Thanopoulos (surname), Greek family name